Luis Valcarce Vidal (born 3 February 1993) is a Spanish professional footballer who plays for CD Badajoz. Mainly a left-back, he can also play as a left winger.

Club career
Born in Ponferrada, Castile and León, Valcarce began his career with hometown club SD Ponferradina, making his senior debut with the reserves. In 2011 he moved to CD Numancia, being initially assigned to the youth setup and being promoted to the B team after one year.

On 17 August 2013, Valcarce played his first professional match, coming on as a second-half substitute in a 0–0 away draw against CD Lugo in the Segunda División. On 30 January 2015, both he – injured at the time – and his twin brother Pablo renewed their contract with the Rojillos, until 2017.

Valcarce was definitely promoted to the main squad on 20 August 2015, being assigned the no. 14 jersey. He left in June 2019 after his contract expired, and the following month returned to his first club Ponferradina.

On 29 January 2022, after spending the second part of the 2020–21 season and the first part of the following in the Polish I liga with Arka Gdynia, Valcarce returned to Spain and joined second-tier AD Alcorcón on a short-term deal.

References

External links

1993 births
Living people
People from Ponferrada
Spanish twins
Twin sportspeople
Sportspeople from the Province of León
Spanish footballers
Footballers from Castile and León
Association football defenders
Association football wingers
Segunda División players
Tercera División players
Primera Federación players
SD Ponferradina B players
CD Numancia B players
CD Numancia players
SD Ponferradina players
AD Alcorcón footballers
CD Badajoz players
I liga players
Arka Gdynia players
Spanish expatriate footballers
Expatriate footballers in Poland
Spanish expatriate sportspeople in Poland